Tetracha sobrina is a species of tiger beetle that was described by Pierre François Marie Auguste Dejean in 1831.

References

Cicindelidae
Beetles described in 1831